Time Remembered is a modal jazz standard piece by jazz pianist Bill Evans.

Jack Reilly says that the work is both influenced by the sixteenth century modal works of the polyphonist masters (Palestrina, Byrd, Frescobaldi, etc.), and the oeuvre of the impressionist composers (Debussy and Ravel).

It was recorded for the first time in 1962 for the album Loose Blues (released posthumously only in 1982) and released for the first time in 1966 in Bill Evans Trio with Symphony Orchestra.

Harmonic analysis
The work is built over four modes: dorian, phrygian, lydian, and aeolian; and is notable for lacking dominant-like seventh chords, thus only using major and minor chords and their extensions (thus employing many added 9ths, 11ths, and 13ths). According to Reilly, these two factors give the work a modal and impressionistic flavor.

References

Further reading
 

Jazz compositions
Jazz compositions in B minor